Lowlife is a semi-autobiographical comic book series written and drawn by Ed Brubaker, originally published by Caliber Comics and later Aeon Press. Collected editions were put out by Aeon and Black Eye Books.

The Comics Journal described the book as following the "frustration and cynicism of disenchanted slacker kids finding excitement in their uneventful lives." The series was described by The Stranger as "part fiction, part autobiography, the narratives hover between sincerity and parody, with moments of transcendence that lift it out of the realm of the ordinary comic book."

Brubaker cited his work here as an influence on later works:

Development and publication history
Lowlife was Brubaker's first professional work. The work is semi-autobiographical, based upon the lives of the author and his friends but "with the names changed."

Lowlife debuted in 1992 with two issues published by Caliber Comics. Issues #3–5 were published in 1994–1995 by the MU Press imprint Aeon Press.

Collected editions
The series has been collected into a number of trade paperbacks:
The Portable Lowlife (48 pages, Aeon, 1995)
A Complete Lowlife (112 pages, Black Eye Books, 1997, Top Shelf Productions, 2001)

References

External links 
 
 
 

Comics by Ed Brubaker
1992 comics debuts
1995 comics endings